Fernando Hofileña Lopez Sr.  (April 13, 1904May 26, 1993) was a Filipino statesman. A member of the influential Lopez family of Iloilo, he served as vice president of the Philippines for three terms – under Elpidio Quirino (1949–1953) for the Liberals and Ferdinand Marcos (1965–1969 and 1969–1972) for the Nacionalistas. He was also the chairman of ABS-CBN Corporation from 1986 to his death in 1993.

Early life and career
Lopez was born on April 13, 1904, in Jaro, Iloilo City to Benito Villanueva Lopez and Presentacion Javelona Hofileña. He was the younger brother and only sibling of Eugenio Lopez Sr. The Lopez family was the richest and most influential family in the province.

Lopez studied high school at Colegio de San Juan de Letran, finishing in 1921. He studied law in the University of Santo Tomas, earning his Bachelor of Laws degree in 1925. After passing the bar examinations, he did not go into private practice, but helped his older brother manage the family business.

In 1945, with no prior political experience, Lopez was chosen by President Sergio Osmeña to be mayor of Iloilo City. In 1947, he ran for senator and won.

Lopez was one of the founders of University of Iloilo and the FEATI University in Manila.

The brothers Eugenio and Fernando owned the Iloilo-Negros Air Express Company (the first Filipino owned air service), the Iloilo Times (El Tiempo), the Manila Chronicle and ABS-CBN Corporation, LSC (Lopez Sugar Corporation), Bayantel (including Bayan DSL), SkyCable (including SkyBroadband), Meralco, RLC (Rockwell Land Corporation), Rockwell Center, First Balfour, Inc., Philippine Electric Corporation (Philec), First Electro Dynamics Corporation (Fedcor), First Sumiden Circuits, Inc. (FSCI), Securities Transfer Services, Inc. (STSI), The Medical City (TMC), BayanTrade DotCom, First Gas Holdings Corporation (Santa Rita), FGP. Corp. (San Lorenzo), FG Hydro Power Corporation (Pantabangan-Masiway), FG Bukidnon (Agusan mini-hydro), Bauang Private Power Corporation (Bauang), Panay Electric Company (PECO), First Philippine Industrial Corporation (the major fuel distributor of Shell and Chevron Caltex in the country), First Philippine Realty Corp, First Philippine Electric Corp. (First Philec), First Philec Solar Corporation, First Sumiden Circuits, Inc. (FSCI), First Sumiden Realty, Inc, First Philippine Industrial Park.

Vice-presidency

First term (1949–1953)

In 1949, Lopez became vice-president under President Elpidio Quirino and concurrently worked as secretary of agriculture, serving until 1953.  He was then elected once again as senator, and re-elected in 1959.

Second and third term (1965–1972)

In 1965, Lopez ran with Ferdinand Marcos and won as vice-president. He was re-elected in 1969, making him, to date the only vice-president to serve two non-consecutive terms, two different presidents and from different parties. By the time martial law was declared in 1972, the Lopez family fell out of Marcos' favor and was targeted by the regime because of their denunciations of Marcos. The position of vice-president was abolished, and the Lopez family was stripped of most of its political and economic assets.

Later life and death
After the removal of Marcos from power as a result of the People Power Revolution of 1986, Lopez became chairman of FHL Investment Corporation and vice-chairman of First Philippine Holdings Corporation.

He died on May 26, 1993, a month after his 89th birthday leaving his wife Mariquit Javellana with whom he had six children: Yolanda, Fernando, Jr. (Junjie), Alberto (Albertito), Emmanuele, Benito and Mita. He was also the longest living vice president until he was surpassed by Teofisto Guingona Jr. in 2017.

Honors and awards

 : The Order of the Knights of Rizal, Knight Grand Cross of Rizal (KGCR).

References

|-

Colegio de San Juan de Letran alumni
University of Santo Tomas alumni
López family of Iloilo
People from Iloilo City
1904 births
1993 deaths
Nacionalista Party politicians
Liberal Party (Philippines) politicians
Presidents pro tempore of the Senate of the Philippines
Senators of the 5th Congress of the Philippines
Senators of the 4th Congress of the Philippines
Senators of the 3rd Congress of the Philippines
Senators of the 1st Congress of the Philippines
Vice presidents of the Philippines
Secretaries of Agriculture of the Philippines
Secretaries of Environment and Natural Resources of the Philippines
Mayors of places in Iloilo
Mayors of Iloilo City
20th-century Filipino lawyers
Ferdinand Marcos administration cabinet members
Quirino administration cabinet members
Candidates in the 1969 Philippine vice-presidential election
Candidates in the 1965 Philippine vice-presidential election
Candidates in the 1949 Philippine vice-presidential election
Chairmen of ABS-CBN
Filipino chairpersons of corporations
Filipino television company founders